Brockius is a genus of labrisomid blennies from the waters of the eastern Pacific and the western Atlantic where they are associated with reefs and seaweed-covered rocks.

Species
The species in the genus are:

Brockius albigenys (Beebe & Tee-Van, 1928) (White-cheek blenny)
Brockius nigricinctus (Howell-Rivero), 1936 (Spotcheek blenny)
Brockius striatus (Clark L. Hubbs, 1953)  (Green blenny)

Taxonomy
The name Brockius was coined by Clark L. Hubbs as a subgenus of Labrisomus but has been raised to a genus in its own right.

Etymology
The generic name honours the ichthyologist and herpetologist Vernon E. Brock (1912-1971) who collected the type of B. striatus.

References

 
Labrisomidae
Ray-finned fish genera
Taxa named by Clark Hubbs